The Gesù Vecchio is a church in Naples, Italy. Its full title is the Basilica Sanctuary of the Gesù Vecchio or Basilica Sanctuary of the Immaculate Conception and Don Placido. It was founded in 1554 and promoted to minor basilica status in 1958. Its name distinguishes it from the nearby Gesù Nuovo, built to cope with the expansion of the Jesuit order in the city.

See also
 List of Jesuit sites

Churches in Naples
Basilica churches in Naples
1554 establishments in Italy